Ram Sewak Paikra (born 7 February 1962) is an Indian politician and former Home Minister of Chhattisgarh. He is a senior BJP leader. He was the Member of Chhattisgarh Legislative Assembly from Pratappur constituency of Chhattisgarh

Political career
Paikra was first elected to Chhattisgarh Legislative Assembly in 2003 by defeating senior Congress leader Premsai Singh. Before this he unsuccessfully contested Madhya Pradesh Assembly election two times 1993 and 1998. He contested 2008 Chhattisgarh Assembly election but lost by margin of 2,373 votes but in 2013 Assembly election, he won by margin of 8,143 votes and became Home minister in Raman Singh's cabinet. In 2018 Assembly election, he was defeated by Premsai Singh Tekam of the INC.

References

Bharatiya Janata Party politicians from Chhattisgarh
Living people
State cabinet ministers of Chhattisgarh
People from Surajpur district
1962 births